Cthulhu Cultus was a small press horror magazine, that was published from 1995 to 2001. Its total run included 18 issues. Cthulhu Cultus published the works of established horror fiction and noir writers like Joseph S. Pulver and D.F. Lewis, and was devoted to weird, supernatural and horror fiction and poetry with an emphasis on H. P. Lovecraft's Cthulhu Mythos.

It was published by Mythos Books. Editions were published by Philip Marsh and Tani Jantsang in Florida, and the Associate Editor was James Ambuehl. Illustrations were done by T. Marsh. The editors also recorded a 60-minute CD of original Cthulhu Cultus Music.

Contributors
Contributors included James Ambuehl, Tracy Ambuehl, Kenneth J. Beattle, Robert Bee, R.D. Bookout, Crispin Burnham, R. S. Cartwright, Lee Clark, Jason Gridley, Peter F. Guenther, Jonathon William Hodges, Tani Jantsang, J.W. Kelley, D.F. Lewis (Nemonymous), Philip Marsh, Andy Nunez, Brian Nutter, Duane Pesice, Robert M. Price (Crypt of Cthulhu), Joseph S. Pulver (Cthulhu Codex), P.J. Roberts, Ian Rogers, Kevin Eric Sheridan, Ron Shiflet, Kenneth Silver, G.W.Thomas, John H. Toon, Ray Wallace, and Peter A. Worthy (Al-Azif).

Publisher 
Phillip Marsh and Tani Jantsang; Captiva Island, Florida, #1–3
Phillip Marsh and Tani Jantsang; Lehigh Acres, FL, #4-

Issues

References 

Locus Magazine
Locus Magazine Homepage
Nightscape

2001 disestablishments in Florida
1995 establishments in Florida
Defunct magazines published in the United States
Horror fiction magazines
Magazines disestablished in 2001
Magazines established in 1995
Magazines published in Florida
Small press publishing companies
Triannual magazines published in the United States